The 1988–89 Sussex County Football League season was the 64th in the history of Sussex County Football League a football competition in England.

Division One

Division One featured 15 clubs which competed in the division last season, along with three new clubs:
Langney Sports, promoted from Division Two
Oakwood, promoted from Division Two
Redhill, transferred from the Spartan League

League table

Division Two

Division Two featured twelve clubs which competed in the division last season, along with two new clubs:
Broadbridge Heath, promoted from Division Three
Horsham YMCA, relegated from Division One

League table

Division Three

Division Three featured twelve clubs which competed in the division last season, along with four new clubs:
Falcons
Forest
Stamco, joined from the Southern Counties Combination
Wigmore Athletic, relegated from Division Two, who also changed name to Worthing United

League table

References

1988-89
1988–89 in English football leagues